.
Mojo